
This list shows some authors from Brittany.

A
Albert Le Grand
Bertrand d'Argentré
Guy Autret de Missirien
Octave-Louis Aubert

B
Erwan Berthou
Gwilherm Berthou
Theodore Botrel
Anatole Le Braz
Yann Brekilien
Fañch Broudig

C
François-René de Chateaubriand
Tristan Corbière, French language poet
Jeanne Coroller-Danio

C'H
Reun ar C'halan, also known as René Galand

D
Emile Danoën
François Debeauvais
Jean-Marie Déguignet
Pêr Denez, Breton language novelist
Youenn Drezen
Jean Dupuis (En Neue)

E
Fañch Eliès better known as Abeozen

F
François Falc'hun

G
René Galand
Xavier Grall
Jules Gros 
Eugène Guillevic
Louis Guilloux
Youenn Gwernig, Breton language poet

H
Per Jakez Helias, Breton language poet
Roparz Hemon, Breton language poet
Loeiz Herrieu
Théodore Hersart de la Villemarqué (Kervarker)

J
Alfred Jarry
Job Jaffré
François Jaffrennou
Gerard Jaffrès

K
Yann-Ber Kalloc'h
Corentin Louis Kervran

L
Célestin Lainé (Neven an Henaff)
Yves Lainé
Xavier de Langlais (Langleiz)
Pierre Le Baud
Morvan Lebesque
Charles Le Goffic
Camille Le Mercier d'Erm
François-Marie Luzel

M
Emile Masson
Olier Mordrel
Françoise Morvan

P
Jean-Marie Perrot

Q
Henri Queffélec
Yann Queffélec

R
Ernest Renan
Armand Robin
Guy Ropartz
Louis Napoleon Le Roux

S
Guillaume de Saint-André
Victor Segalen

T
Louis Tiercelin

V

Erwan Vallerie
Jules Verne

External links (in French)
Bibliographie de Bretagne, ouvrages littéraires et autres.
Institut culturel de Bretagne, section littérature.

Breton